Line S2 of the Wenzhou Rail Transit is a suburban rapid transit line currently under construction in Wenzhou that will be running from Qingdong Road to Dongshan. It is expected to open in 2023. The full line will be 62.9 kilometres long.

Stations

References

02